Pareronia phocaea is a species of pierine butterfly endemic to the Philippines.

Subspecies
P. p. phocaea (Philippines: Mindanao)
P. p. ariamena (Fruhstorfer, 1910) (Philippines: Basilan)

References

External links
Images representing Pareronia phocaea at Encyclopedia of Life

phocaea
Butterflies described in 1861
Butterflies of Asia
Endemic fauna of the Philippines
Taxa named by Baron Cajetan von Felder
Taxa named by Rudolf Felder